Iodoxamic acid (trade name Endobil) is an organoiodine compound used as a radiocontrast agent. It features both a high iodine content as well as several hydrophilic groups.

See also 
 Iodinated contrast

References 

Radiocontrast agents
Iodoarenes
Benzoic acids
Anilides
Propionamides